Prince Royal may refer to the Crown Prince in the case of the following monarchies:-
 Prince Royal of Portugal, the Prince Royal of the Kingdom of Portugal and the Algarves
 Prince Royal of Haiti, see Jacques-Victor Henry, Prince Royal of Haiti
 Prince Royal of France, to either of:
 Louis XVII of France, during the monarchy of 1791-1792
 Ferdinand Philippe, Duke of Orléans, during the July Monarchy

It may also refer to:
 HMS Prince Royal (1610), a ship of the English Royal Navy
 Prince Royal (horse), Italian/French Champion racehorse
 Nissan Prince Royal, a Japanese vehicle built for the Imperial Household of Japan.

See also 
 Prince Imperial (disambiguation)
 Princess Royal, a style customarily awarded by a British monarch to his or her eldest daughter
 Prince Royal's College, a school in Thailand